This is a list of newspapers in Wales. It includes historical and current titles. Free newspapers are marked with a *.

West Wales Chronicle 
 The Aberdare Leader
 The Aberdare Times
 The Aberystwyth Observer
 Aberystwyth Times
 Yr Amserau
 Baner ac Amserau Cymru
 Bangor and Anglesey Mail
 Barry & District News
 Border Counties Advertizer
 Brecon and Radnor Express
 The Brecon County Times
 The Brecon Reporter
 Burry Port Star
 Y Byd
 Caernarfon and Denbigh Herald
 Caerphilly Observer
 The Cambrian – Swansea
 Cambrian News – Aberystwyth
 The Cardiff and Merthyr Guardian
 The Cardiff Times
 The Cardigan Bay Visitor
 The Cardigan Observer
 Carmarthen Journal
 Carmarthenshire Herald
 Carmarthen Weekly Reporter
 Carnarvon and Denbigh Herald
 Celtic Weekly Newspapers
 Ceredigion Herald
 County Echo – Fishguard
 County Observer and Monmouthshire Central Advertiser
 County Times – Mid Wales
 Y Cymro
 Daily Post – North Wales
 The Demetian Mirror
 Denbigh, Ruthin and Vale of Clwyd Free Press
 Denbighshire Free Press
 Y Dinesydd – Cardiff
 Y Dydd
 Echo Extra*
 Y Faner Newydd
 Flintshire Evening Leader
 Flintshire Observer
 Flintshire Standard*
 gair rhydd*
 Y Genedl Gymreig
 Glamorgan Gazette – Bridgend
 Glamorgan Star* Vale of Glamorgan
 Glamorgan Monmouth and Brecon Gazette and Merthyr Guardian Y Goleuad Gwalia Gwent Gazette Y Gwladgarwr Y Gwyliedydd Haverfordwest & Milford Haven Telegraph Holyhead and Anglesey Mail Illustrated Usk Observer The Leader Llais Y Wlad Y Llan Llanelli Herald Llanelli Star Llangollen Advertiser Llien Gwyn Merthyr Express Merthyr Pioneer The Merthyr Telegraph Mid Wales Journal Milford and West Wales Mercury Monmouthshire Beacon Monmouthshire Merlin The National Neath Guardian Nene – Rhosllannerchrugog area
 North Wales Chronicle*
 North Wales Express North Wales Gazette North Wales Pioneer*
 North Wales Weekly News Papur Bro The Pembrokeshire Herald Penarth Times Pontypool Free Press Pontypridd Chronicle Pontypridd & Llantrisant Observer Potter's Electric News The Principality Y Rhedegydd Rhondda Leader Rhyl Journal*
 Seren Cymru Seren Gomer South Wales Argus – South East Wales
 South Wales Echo – Cardiff area
 South Wales Evening Post – South West Wales
 South Wales Guardian – Carmarthenshire
 Swansea Herald of Wales Tarian y Gweithiwr Tenby Observer This Week* –  national tourism newspaper for Wales
 Tivyside Advertiser – Cardigan, Newcastle Emlyn and the Teifi Valley
 Y Tyst a'r Dydd Y Tyst Cymreig The Visitors' List and Guide Wales Business Insider The Weekly Mail The Welsh Globe The Welshman Y Werin West Wales Echo Western Mail Western Telegraph – Pembrokeshire
 Wrexham and Denbigh Weekly Advertiser Wrexham Chronicle Wrexham Evening Leader Wrexham Guardian Wrexham Leader'' (Big Leader)*

See also
 History of British newspapers
 List of newspapers in the United Kingdom
 List of Welsh-language media#Printed media
 Media in Wales
 Media Wales
 Newspapers
 Welsh Newspapers Online

References

Wales
Newspapers in Wales
Wales
Newspapers